Sidney Outlaw (born April 11, 1992) is an American mixed martial artist who competes in the Lightweight division of the Bellator MMA. As of November 22, 2022, he is #5 in the Bellator Lightweight Rankings.

Background 
Born and raised in North Philadelphia, Pennsylvania, Outlaw began his wrestling career in high school, then developing his passion for professional mixed martial arts by the age of sixteen. He was a league champion and state tournament qualifier. Outlaw also holds an accomplished background competing in Brazilian jiu-jitsu.

From the age of 19 till 27, when he signed with Bellator, Outlaw was homeless on and off. He would train in the day, and then work until 2 am every day, before being back in the gym at 9 am. He made his amateur debut as a teenage in high school, discovering MMA after moving out to the Souderton, Pennsylvania due to his mother wanting to move Sidney out of the crime ridden area they grew up in.

At the age of 18, Sidney decided to move to New Jersey to train with the likes of Frankie Edgar and Eddie Alvarez.

Mixed martial arts career

Early career 
Making his debut at Cage Fury Fighting Championships 19, he won his debut via second round TKO stoppage, before winning his next bout via third round submission under the Ring of Combat banner. Then he got the call to fight at Bellator 118, where he won a unanimous decision over Mike Bannon. He would suffer his first loss against Nick Browne at WSOF 13, losing by TKO stoppage 25 seconds into the bout. Complications between his manager and the promotion left him unaware he was even fighting until a week out from the event, leading him to undergo a drastic, rapid weight cut.

After going 2-1 in his next three bouts, Outlaw faced future UFC fighter Gregor Gillespie at Ring of Combat 55 in June 2016. Despite taking Gillespie's back late in the first round and close to securing the rear-naked choke, only being denied by the bell ending the round, Outlaw lost the close bout via split decision.

After winning the next three bouts, winning the ROC Welterweight and Lightweight Championships, Outlaw was invited on short notice to Dana White's Contender Series 2, facing Michael Cora at welterweight and without a full camp. Despite winning the bout via unanimous decision, he wasn't given a UFC contract.

In his next bout, he faced future PFL Lightweight champion Raush Manfio for the Titan FC Lightweight Championship at Titan FC 50. However, changed it was changed to a non-title bout when Outlaw missed weight,159.9 lbs. Outlaw would go on to win the bout via unanimous decision..

Outlaw defended his ROC Welterweight title against Krzysztof Kułak at ROC 65, winning by second round armbar, and would go on to win his next two bouts on the regional scene, defeating Zazch Fears via first round armbar at Island Fights 51 and Cesar Balmaceda at CFFC 74 via first round rear-naked choke.

Bellator MMA 
Outlaw made his Bellator debut at Bellator 234 on November 14, 2019 against Roger Huerta. Outlaw won via unanimous decision.

Outlaw, as a replacement for Benson Henderson, faced former two-time Bellator Lightweight Champion Michael Chandler at Bellator 237 on December 29, 2019. Outlaw lost the fight via knockout in round one.

Outlaw next faced Adam Piccolotti at Bellator 244 on August 21, 2020. Outlaw won the fight via split decision. 2 out of 2 media scores gave it to Outlaw.

Outlaw faced Myles Jury at Bellator 261 on June 25, 2021. After dominating Jury on the ground, Outlaw won the bout via rear-naked choke submission in round three.

Outlaw was scheduled to challenge for the Bellator MMA Lightweight Championship against reigning champ Patricky Pitbull on July 22, 2022 at Bellator 283. On July 4, it was announced that Patricky had substained an injury, and The next day, after he was booked against Tofiq Musayev in the co-main. Outlaw lost the bout via TKO stoppage 27 seconds into the bout.

Bellator Lightweight World Grand Prix 
On January 11, 2023, Outlaw was announced as one of the 8 participants in the $1 million Bellator Lightweight World Grand Prix. Outlaw was scheduled to face Mansour Barnaoui on May 12, 2023, at Bellator 296. However at the end of February, Outlaw tested postive for banned substances: ostarine, cardarine and anastrozole, and was suspended for 6 months, being eligible to return on August 4, 2023.

Championships and achievements 
Ring of Combat
ROC Welterweight Championship (One time)
One successful title defense
ROC Lightweight Championship (One time)

Mixed martial arts record

|-
|Loss
|align=center|16–5
|Tofiq Musayev
|TKO (punches)
|Bellator 283
|
|align=center|1
|align=center|0:27
|Tacoma, Washington, United States
|
|-
|Win
|align=center| 16–4
|Myles Jury
|Submission (rear-naked choke)
|Bellator 261 
|
|align=center|3
|align=center|4:44
|Uncasville, Connecticut, United States 
|
|-
| Win
| align=center| 15–4
| Adam Piccolotti
|Decision (split)
|Bellator 244
|
|align=center|3
|align=center|5:00
|Uncasville, Connecticut, United States
|
|-
| Loss
| align=center| 14–4
| Michael Chandler
|KO (punches)
|Bellator 237
|
|align=center|1
|align=center|2:59
|Saitama, Japan
|
|-
|  Win
| align=center| 14–3
| Roger Huerta
|Decision (unanimous)
|Bellator 234
|
|align=center|3
|align=center|5:00
|Tel Aviv, Israel
|
|-
|  Win
| align=center| 13–3
| Cesar Balmaceda
| Submission (rear-naked choke)
|CFFC 74
|
|align=center|1
|align=center|2:30
|Atlantic City, New Jersey, United States
|
|-
| Win
| align=center| 12–3
| Zach Fears
|Submission (armbar)
|Island Fights 51
|
|align=center|1
|align=center|4:52
|Pensacola, Florida, United States
| 
|-
| Win
| align=center| 11–3
| Krzysztof Kułak
| Submission (armbar)
|Ring of Combat 65
|
|align=center|2 
|align=center|1:46
|Atlantic City, New Jersey, United States
|
|-
| Win
| align=center| 10–3
| Raush Manfio
| Decision (unanimous)
|Titan FC 50
|
|align=center|3
|align=center|5:00
|Fort Lauderdale, Florida, United States
|
|-
| Win
| align=center| 9–3
| Michael Cora
| Decision (unanimous)
|Dana White's Contender Series 2
|
|align=center|3
|align=center|5:00
|Las Vegas, Nevada, United States
|
|-
| Win
| align=center|8–3
| James Rumley
| Submission (rear-naked choke)
| Ring of Combat 59
| 
| align=center|1
| align=center|4:18
| Atlantic City, New Jersey, United States
|
|-
| Win
| align=center|7–3
| Taj Abdul-Hakim
|Decision (unanimous)
|Ring of Combat 58
|
|align=center|3
|align=center|5:00
|Atlantic City, New Jersey, United States
|
|-
| Win
| align=center|6–3
| Lashawn Alcocks
| Submission (rear-naked choke)
| PA Cage Fight 26
| 
| align=center| 2
| align=center| 2:55
| Scranton, Pennsylvania, United States
|
|-
| Loss
| align=center|5–3
| Gregor Gillespie
| Decision (split) 
| Ring of Combat 55
| 
| align=center|3
| align=center|5:00 
| Atlantic City, New Jersey, United States
|
|-
| Loss
| align=center| 5–2
| Elijah Harshbarger
| Submission (guillotine choke)
| Ring of Combat 53
| 
| align=center| 1
| align=center| 0:46
| Atlantic City, New Jersey, United States
| 
|-
| Win
| align=center| 5–1
| Darrius Heyliger
| Submission (rear-naked choke)
| NEF 19: Homecoming
|
|align=Center|1
|align=center|3:42
|Lewiston, Maine, United States
|
|-
| Win
| align=center| 4–1
| Christian Leonard
| Decision (unanimous)
| Global Proving Ground 21
| 
| align=center| 3
| align=center| 5:00
|Pennsauken, New Jersey, United States
| 
|-
| Loss
| align=center| 3–1
| Nick Browne
| TKO (punches)
|WSOF 13
|
|align=center|1
|align=center|0:25
|Bethlehem, Pennsylvania, United States
| 
|-
| Win
| align=center| 3–0
|Mike Bannon
|Decision (unanimous)
|Bellator 118
|
|align=center|3
|align=center|5:00
|Atlantic City, New Jersey, United States
| 
|-
| Win
| align=center| 2–0
| Steve Simms
| Submission (rear-naked choke)
| Ring of Combat 45
| 
| align=center| 3
| align=center| 3:37
| Atlantic City, New Jersey, United States
|
|-
| Win
| align=center| 1–0
| Mtume Goodrum
| TKO (punches)
| CFFC 19
| 
| align=center| 2
| align=center| 4:04
| Richmond, Virginia, United States
|

See also 
 List of current Bellator MMA fighters
 List of male mixed martial artists

References

External links 
  
  

1992 births
Living people
American male mixed martial artists
Lightweight mixed martial artists
Mixed martial artists utilizing wrestling
Mixed martial artists utilizing Brazilian jiu-jitsu
American male sport wrestlers
Amateur wrestlers
American practitioners of Brazilian jiu-jitsu